Scratchboard (North America and Australia) or scraperboard (Great Britain), is a form of direct engraving where the artist scratches off dark ink to reveal a white or colored layer beneath.  Scratchboard refers to both a fine-art medium, and an illustrative technique using sharp knives and tools for engraving into a thin layer of white China clay that is coated with dark, often black India ink. There is also foil paper covered with black ink that, when scratched, exposes the shiny surface beneath. Scratchboard can be used to yield highly detailed, precise and evenly textured artwork.  Works can be left black and white, or colored.

History
Modern scraperboard originated in the 19th century in Britain and France. As printing methods developed, scraperboard became a popular medium for reproduction because it replaced wood, metal and linoleum engraving. It allowed for a fine line appearance that could be photographically reduced for reproduction without losing quality. It was most effective and expeditious for use in single-color book and newspaper printing. From the 1930s to 1950s, it was one of the preferred techniques for medical, scientific and product illustration. During that time period, Virgil Finlay made very detailed illustrations, often combining scraperboard methods with traditional pen & ink techniques, and producing highly detailed artworks.  In more recent years, it has made a comeback as an appealing medium for editorial illustrators of magazines, ads, graphic novels, and one of a kind pieces of fine art displayed in galleries and museums internationally.

Technique 
Unlike many drawing media, where the artist adds in the mid-tones and shadows, with scratchboard the artist is working by adding in the highlights. The artist can use a variety of tools to scratch away the black ink from the board and reveal more or less of the white clay that is underneath (see materials list below for tools). After black ink has been removed as desired the work may be considered complete, or subsequently be colored with watercolors, airbrush, ink, color pencil or acrylics. Transparent media are generally used to color scratchboard, as they fill in the white scratches without affecting the black ink left on the board. After an area has been colored it can be scratched again, revealing more of the white clay. Sometimes the artist will color and scratch several times to create subtle shading or color variations. This technique can yield a graphic image that can be very detailed. Artists that begin with a white clay-coated board will add their own ink to the surface, and then scratch away the ink in the same manner as described above. After completion, the artwork may be varnished to protect it against damage.

Materials and tools
Scratchboard itself comes either with a paper (cardboard) backing, or a hardboard support. While the cardboard does have its uses, as it can be easily cut into size, the hardboard is much superior, giving greater stability to the work, being able to be corrected more often.  It is more durable and easier to scratch into for cleaner, crisper details and lines. Several tools have been created specifically for scratchboard; however any sharp implement will do though a range of blades of different thicknesses allows the removal of more or less of the ink at will (see variety of tools listed below).  Isopropyl Alcohol on a cotton swab or cotton ball, sandpaper and non-oily, fine, steel wool are also useful for removing large areas, and creating texture.  Coloring scratchboard, black or white boards, can be done with many media applied with paint brush, air brush, and even cotton balls.  Special scratchboard colored inks can be added to the white areas and then scratched again for additional highlights and volume for added dimension. While some artists choose to make their own scratchboards, most artists work on commercially available materials.

Some of the tools professional scratchboard artists use for scratching through the ink include xacto blades, scalpel blades, tattoo needles, tips made by speedball (scratchboard tips #112 and 113), tips made by scratch-art brand, small fiberglass brushes, wire brushes, sandpaper, steel wool, parallel-line tool, ink erasers, and more. Various techniques such as hatching or stippling can be used to detail the image. The 14" X 18" scratchboard Sunflower And Silver by Diana Lee is an example of black scratchboard colored with transparent ink. An extreme close up lets the detail of the scratching be more easily seen.

Artists 
Notable contemporary illustrators who have worked in the scratchboard medium include Gary Bullock (UK Illustrator), Michael McCurdy, Peter Blake, Virgil Finlay, John Schoenherr, Sally Maxwell, Gary Houston, Jos Sances, Russ Mullins, Bill Russell, David Klein, Mark Summers, Peter Kuper and Scott McKowen.

In 2011, the International Society of Scratchboard Artists (ISSA) was launched to help promote scratchboard art as a fine art medium, as well as to help educate the public about the medium. The organization holds at least one annual exhibition dedicated exclusively to scratchboard art in a gallery or museum each year.

References

Further reading
 Merritt Dana Cutler, Scratchboard Drawing, 1949, Watson-Guptill Publications.
 Ruth Lozner, Scratchboard for Illustration, 1990, Watson-Guptill Publications,  
 Merritt Cutler, "How to Cut Drawings on Scratchboard", 1960, Watson-Guptill Publications, 

Drawing
Crafts
Artistic techniques